Brightest Blue is the fourth studio album by English singer and songwriter Ellie Goulding. It was released on 17 July 2020 through Polydor Records. Originally scheduled for 5 June 2020, the album's release was delayed due to the COVID-19 pandemic. The album was preceded by three singles: "Worry About Me", "Power" and "Slow Grenade", and features guest vocals from Blackbear, Diplo, Juice WRLD, Lauv, serpentwithfeet and Swae Lee. It is Goulding's first album since Delirium (2015). Brightest Blue received generally positive reviews from music critics. The album was also a commercial success. It became Goulding's third album to peak at number one in the UK and fourth album to debut inside the top three on the chart. The album also peaked inside the top ten in several other countries. To promote the album, Goulding was set to embark on the Brightest Blue Tour on 28 April 2021, however this was pushed back to 5 October 2021 due to COVID-19 restrictions in the UK.

Background
In January 2017, Goulding announced that work on new music had begun. In April of the same year, producer BloodPop revealed on social media he was in the studio with Goulding. That same month, Goulding released a collaboration with Kygo entitled "First Time". On 24 October 2018, she released "Close to Me" with Diplo and Swae Lee. She told The Guardian in early 2019, "It's very much written by me." She further discussed three new songs: "Flux", "Love I'm Given" and "Electricity". "Flux" was released on 1 March of the same year.

In July 2019, Goulding stated that her next material to be released would be the songs "Woman I Am" and "Start". In November, she released her rendition of Joni Mitchell's Christmas song "River", which topped the UK Singles Chart, becoming her third UK number-one single and the last UK number one song of the 2010s. In a March 2020 interview with Heart, Goulding revealed that the album "kind of comes in two parts," adding that she plays the guitar, bass and piano on the project. During an appearance on The Late Late Show with James Corden, she described the album as having two sides, revealing that the first side will features songs written entirely by her, while the second is described as being "like an alter ego" and contains the majority of singles released from 2018 to 2020.

Release and promotion
On 27 May 2020, Goulding announced Brightest Blue as the album's title, alongside its cover artwork, release dates and formats, and track listing. The album's pre-order was made alongside the announcement. The first side, Brightest Blue, features 13 total tracks, while the second EG.0, features the previously-released "Close to Me", "Hate Me" and "Worry About Me", as well as two new tracks. Originally scheduled for release on 5 June 2020, it was later delayed to 12 June, and later to 17 July of the same year. On 13 July of the same year, she released a trailer for the album on YouTube. In support of the album, Goulding embarked on the Brightest Blue Tour, which began on the 28 April 2021. 

For the album's physical release, Goulding and her team opted to have copies manufactured with as many environmentally-friendly materials as possible. According to Goulding's official digital store, a regular single-disc CD is packaged in a Digisleeve manufactured with FSC-certified recycled cardboard and is sealed in a "plant-based" wrap. Variations of formats such as cassette tapes and vinyl records have also been manufactured with minimised or recycled plastic materials and packaging. Goulding added "[...] great progress has been made on this and I'm pleased we've been able to push the industry forwards, but we are still pushing to do more."

Singles
On 13 March 2020, Goulding released "Worry About Me", a collaboration with Blackbear, as the first single from the album. The accompanying music video, directed by Emil Nava, was released the same day. Upon the song's release, it received generally positive reviews from music critics. Commercially, the song debuted at number 78 on the UK Singles Chart. On 21 May 2020, "Power" was released as the album's second single. The accompanying music video was directed by Imogen Snell and Riccardo Castano, and was released later the same day. It peaked at number 86 in the UK. The Lauv-assisted "Slow Grenade" was released as the third single on 30 June 2020. "Love I'm Given" was released as the album's fourth single on 19 August 2020, along with a music video.

Brightest Blue Tour

Critical reception

Brightest Blue received generally favourable reviews from music critics. At Metacritic, which assigns a normalised rating out of 100 to reviews from professional critics, the album received a weighted average score of 74, based on ten reviews. Aggregator AnyDecentMusic? gave the album a 6.7 out of 10, based on their assessment of the critical consensus.

Reviewing the album for AllMusic, Neil Z. Yeung called the album, "a powerful reclamation of self that recaptures the simplicity of her debut and the vulnerability of Halcyon", as well as a statement that "has growth and maturity at its core".

Commercial performance
Brightest Blue became Goulding's third number-one album in the United Kingdom, debuting with sales of 14,820 units.

Track listing

Notes
  signifies a primary and vocal producer
  signifies a co-producer
  signifies an additional producer
  signifies a vocal producer
 "Power" interpolates "Be the One", as performed by Dua Lipa and written by Lucy Taylor, Nicholas James Gale and Jack Tarrant. This song also interpolates "Georgy Porgy", as performed by Toto and written by David Paich.

Personnel
Musicians

 Ellie Goulding – vocals (all tracks), background vocals (tracks 2, 15), guitar (7)
 Joe Kearns – drums (1, 13), keyboards (1, 4, 6–8, 11, 13), programming (1, 4, 6–8, 11–14), piano (6, 10), keyboards arrangement (11), bass guitar (12)
 Katherine Jenkinson – cello (1, 6)
 Ashok Klouda – cello (1, 6)
 Emma Denton – cello (1)
 John Myerscough – cello (1)
 Max Cooke – keyboards, piano (1); string arrangement (6, 12, 13)
 Laurie Anderson – viola (1, 6)
 Meghan Cassidy – viola (1, 6)
 Beatrix Lovejoy – violin (1, 6)
 Jenny Sacha – violin (1, 6)
 Mandhira De Saram – violin (1, 6)
 Matthew Denton – violin (1, 6)
 Natalie Klouda – violin (1, 6)
 Thomas Gould – violin (1, 6)
 Ann Beilby – viola (1)
 Timothy Grant – viola (1)
 Antonia Kesel – violin (1)
 Claudia Ajmone-Marsan – violin (1)
 Elizabeth Cooney – violin (1)
 Eloisa-Fleur Thom – violin (1)
 Magdalena Filipczak – violin (1)
 Martyn Jackson – violin (1)
 Serpentwithfeet – vocals (1)
 Nicholas Brown – background vocals, choir arrangement, conductor (2, 13), piano (13)
 Olivia Williams – background vocals, choir arrangement (2, 13)
 Althea Edwards – background vocals (2, 13)
 Angel Lindsay-Mae – background vocals (2, 13)
 Dee Lewis-Clay – background vocals (2, 13)
 Desrine Ramus – background vocals (2, 13)
 Gabriele Williams-Silvera – background vocals (2, 13)
 Hannah Khemoh – background vocals (2, 13)
 Joel Bailey – background vocals (2, 13)
 Kenneth Mark Burton – background vocals (2, 13)
 Mariama Frida Touray – background vocals (2, 13)
 Patrick Linton – background vocals (2, 13)
 Paul Boldeau – background vocals (2, 13)
 Philip Kwaku Yeboah – background vocals (2, 13)
 Rochelle Sanderson-Mendes – background vocals (2, 13)
 Serena Prince – background vocals (2, 13)
 Tehillah Daniel – background vocals (2, 13)
 Beau Blaise – background vocals, programming (2)
 Jamie Scott – background vocals, bass guitar, drum programming, guitar, keyboards (2)
 Will Brown – background vocals, synthesizer (2)
 Jonny Coffer – bass guitar, drum programming, guitar, keyboards (2)
 Starsmith – programming, synthesizer (3, 8, 9); keyboards, percussion (3, 9); guitar, piano, saxophone (6)
 Jim Eliot – keyboards (4, 13), programming (4, 13), piano (12)
 Mike Wise – bass guitar, drums, guitar, organ, piano, programming, synthesizer programming (5)
 Zach Bines – vocals (5), spoken word (13)
 Patrick Wimberly – programming (6, 11); bass guitar, drums, guitar (6)
 Ben Chappell – cello (6)
 Jason Klauber – guitar (6)
 David Wrench – programming (6)
 Eoin Schmidt-Martin – viola (6)
 Kotono Sato – viola (6)
 Ariel Lang – violin (6)
 Ciaran McCabe – violin (6)
 Daniel Pioro – violin (6)
 Michelle Fleming – violin (6)
 Nina Foster – violin (6)
 Raja Halder – violin (6)
 Eli Teplin – organ, piano, synth bass, synthesizer (8)
 James Wyatt – strings (8, 9, 11), piano (11, 14); programming, string arrangement (14)
 Rowan McIntosh – acoustic guitar (11)
 Joe Clegg – percussion (12)
 Sam Thompson – piano (13)
 James Brett – conductor (14)
 Bob Knight – vocal arrangement (14)
 Leo Kotecha – background vocals (15)
 Mylo Kotecha – background vocals (15)
 Ilya – bass guitar, drums, percussion (15, 17), programming (15, 17); keyboards arrangement (15); background vocals, guitar, keyboards (17)
 Peter Svensson – guitar (15, 17)
 Savan Kotecha – piano (15), background vocals (17)
 Blackbear – vocals (15)
 Oscar Görres – background vocals (16), bass guitar (16), drums (16), guitar (16), keyboards (16), percussion (16), programming (16)
 Lauv – vocals (16)
 Alvaro – programming (17)
 Bas van Daalen – programming (17)
 Diplo – programming (17)
 Swae Lee – vocals (17)
 Jason Evigan – guitar (18), programming (18)
 The Monsters & Strangerz – programming (18)
 Juice Wrld – vocals (18)

Technical

 Matt Colton – mastering (1–13)
 Randy Merrill – mastering (14–17, 19)
 Michelle Mancini – mastering (18)
 Jamie Snell – mixing (1, 3, 8, 9, 11–13)
 Serban Ghenea – mixing (2, 5, 15–17, 19)
 Jason Elliott – mixing (4, 7, 10), engineering (1, 4–6, 8, 12, 13, 15, 16, 18)
 David Wrench – mixing (6)
 John Hanes – mixing (14), engineering (2, 5, 17, 19), mixing assistance (15, 16)
 Manny Marroquin – mixing (18)
 Andy Cook – engineering (1, 9, 11, 13), engineering assistance (8)
 Joe Kearns – engineering (1, 5–8, 10, 11, 13), vocal engineering (19)
 Adam Miller – engineering (2, 13)
 Martin Hannah – engineering (2)
 Patrick Wimberly – engineering (6, 11)
 Miles BA Robinson – engineering (6)
 Mathew P. Scheiner – engineering (8)
 Nick Taylor – engineering (14)
 Ilya – engineering (15)
 Diplo – engineering (17)
 Swae Lee – engineering (17)
 Sam Holland – engineering (17)
 Randy Lanphear – engineering, mixing assistance (17)
 Chris Galland – mix engineering (5)
 Grace Banks – mixing assistance (6)
 Simon Gooding – mixing assistance (6)
 Josef Gomez – mixing assistance (17)
 Manny Park – engineering assistance (1, 3, 5, 6, 9, 13)
 Luke Gibbs – engineering assistance (4, 7, 10)
 Mark Knight – engineering assistance (12)
 Rowan McIntosh – engineering assistance (12)
 Olly Thompson – engineering assistance (14)
 Cory Brice – engineering assistance (17)
 Jeremy Lertola – engineering assistance (17)

Charts

Certifications

Release history

References

2020 albums
Albums produced by Andrew Watt (record producer)
Albums produced by Diplo
Albums produced by Ilya Salmanzadeh
Albums produced by Jason Evigan
Albums postponed due to the COVID-19 pandemic
Ellie Goulding albums
Polydor Records albums